Cameron Breadner (born 13 October 2000) is a Scottish professional footballer who plays for Caledonian Braves, as a midfielder. 

Breadner started his senior career at St Mirren, with loan spells at Stenhousemuir in February 2019, Albion Rovers, and Forfar Athletic in September 2020.

References

2000 births
Living people
Scottish footballers
St Mirren F.C. players
Stenhousemuir F.C. players
Scottish Professional Football League players
Association football midfielders
Forfar Athletic F.C. players